Jeff Danna is a Canadian film composer. He has composed or co-composed scores for a wide range of films and television, including The Boondock Saints (1999), Resident Evil: Apocalypse (2004), Silent Hill (2006), The Imaginarium of Doctor Parnassus (2009), The Good Dinosaur (2015), Storks (2016), The Breadwinner (2017), The Addams Family (2019), Onward (2020), Guillermo Del Toro’s Tales of Arcadia (2019-2021), Nora Twomey’s My Father’s Dragon (2022) and Julia (2022). 

His older brother, composer Mychael Danna, is a frequent collaborator, and the two have received Emmy nominations for their work on Camelot (2011), Tyrant (2014-2016), and Alias Grace (2017). Additionally, Danna has been nominated for six Annie Awards, won five BMI Film & TV Awards, a Gemini Award, a Genie award, two Hollywood Music in Media Awards, and 15 SOCAN Awards.

Early life 
Danna was born in Burlington, Ontario, to a musical family active in local theatre and church choir. A reluctant young piano student, Danna found solace in an electric guitar left behind at his home by a friend. Unknowingly following in the path of three generations of Winnipeg mandolin players, progress came quickly. He began playing professionally at the age of 15 until a hand injury brought his performance career to a halt at 22.

Career
Danna's first foray into film scoring occurred while recovering from his injury. Unable to play for extended periods of time, his brother, Mychael, suggested that he record the guitar parts on some of Mychael’s first scores, figuring that they could take breaks at intervals as necessitated by his injury. Seeing a way to sustain his music career, Danna turned to film scoring. Subsequently, the brothers' first co-writing venture, Cold Comfort, was nominated for a Genie award and laid the foundation for Jeff’s career in film and many future collaborations with his brother.

After cutting his teeth on independent Canadian features, Danna moved to Los Angeles to begin his work in television, landing jobs on the CBS crime show Sweating Bullets, Beverly Hills 90210,  and the Warner Brothers' legacy title, Kung Fu: The Legend Continues. A series of television movies followed, notably Showtime’s My Own Country for director Mira Nair, The Matthew Shepard Story (a Gemini Best Score winner), Ice Bound, and Spinning Boris for director Roger Spottiswoode.

Feature film work began with the indie Uncorked (At Sachem Farm), starring Minnie Driver and Rufus Sewell, featuring the on-camera fingerstyle guitar solo showcase of the influential "Ross' Concert," played in the studio by Danna and Dean Parks. This was followed by the cult classic The Boondock Saints, which featured choral and orchestral elements mixed with electronica, along with "The Blood Of Cu Chulainn,” a Danna brothers' offering from their album, A Celtic Romance.

Following that was Tim Blake Nelson's O, a modern-day retelling of Shakespeare’s Othello. Danna took the opportunity of the Shakespeare connection to employ a vielle and a viola da gamba in combination with dark orchestral colors, his first of many uses of early music instruments in his scores. By the time O was released in theaters, Danna was at work again with Tim Blake Nelson on his World War II Holocaust drama The Grey Zone. Nelson’s desire for an onerous death camp atmosphere meant that there would be no score in the film until the final credits, where Danna composed a dissonant and powerful dirge, merging a small chamber group with Klezmer soloists, using an approach akin to modes of limited transposition to evoke both a terrible beauty and desolation.

2001 brought forth the first of many collaborations with acclaimed filmmaker Brett Morgen on The Kid Stays in the Picture, a celebrated retelling of producer Robert Evans' book of the same title.

In 2003, Danna was in London working with The London Philharmonia on the large-scale score for The Gospel of John, a medley of which the Philharmonia performed in their summer concert at Royal Festival Hall.

Resident Evil: Apocalypse followed in 2004, earning Danna four SOCAN Awards for International Film Music, and then a reunion with brother Mychael on Terry Gilliam’s Tideland, their first time working together since their Celtic albums, seven years prior.

2006 and 2007 found Danna in Toronto, scoring the movie adaptation of the hit video game franchise Silent Hill for director Christophe Gans. Danna followed that with another Brett Morgen collaboration on Chicago 10, then legendary director Lord Richard Attenborough’s final film, Closing The Ring, and another collaboration with Mychael for Fracture, the psychological legal crime thriller starring Anthony Hopkins and Ryan Gosling.

The following year, the brothers went on to score Sony’s crime thriller Lakeview Terrace, starring Samuel Jackson. The duo then collaborated with Terry Gilliam again for The Imaginarium of Dr. Parnassus, which was nominated for Best Original Score for a Fantasy Film by the International Film Music Critics Awards. Danna's ongoing work with Brett Morgen brought forth Nimrod Nation, a 30-for-30 episode, and the acclaimed documentary Kurt Cobain: Montage of Heck.

In 2014, Jeff and Mychael wrote the original music for the FX series Tyrant, earning them both a Hollywood Music in Media Award for the Main Title, as well as Emmy nominations for Outstanding Music Composition for a Series (Original Dramatic Score) and Outstanding Original Main Title Theme Music, the same category for which they were previously Emmy-nominated for their work on Camelot in 2011.

In 2015, the brothers composed the score for Disney Pixar's The Good Dinosaur, which received a BMI Film and TV Award for Film Music, three SOCAN Awards, a nomination for Best Original Score for an Animated Film by the International Film Music Critics Award, and an Annie nomination for Outstanding Achievement for Music in an Animated Feature Production. More sibling collaborations followed, notably the original score for Warner Brothers' animated film Storks which won a BMI Film and TV Award for Film Music, and Ang Lee’s Billy Lynn’s Long Halftime Walk.

In 2017, Jeff and Mychael undertook scoring Nora Twomey’s The Breadwinner, which had its world premiere at the Toronto International Film Festival. The Breadwinner was nominated for an Annie Award for Outstanding Achievement for Music in an Animated Feature Production, won the Best Original Music Award from the Annecy International Animated Film Festival in France and won the Canadian Screen Award for Film Score of the Year. The brothers followed up that effort with Alias Grace for Netflix, for which they were Emmy nominated in 2018 and garnered a nomination for a Canadian Screen Award.

Returning to animation in 2018, Danna wrote the music for Guillermo del Toro’s animated science-fantasy series Tales of Arcadia, which includes the titles 3Below, Wizards, and Rise of the Titans for Netflix and produced by DreamWorks Animation.

Jeff and Mychael then worked together to score the animated feature The Addams Family, released in 2019, which earned a BMI Film & TV Award for Film Music, and Disney Pixar’s Oscar-nominated animated film Onward, which opened in theaters on March 6, 2020, for which they received an Annie nomination for Best Music for a Feature, a BMI Film & TV Award for Film Music, and an International Film Music Critics Award nomination for Best Original Score for an Animated Film. Following that, he and Mychael wrote the original score for the MGM feature The Addams Family 2, earning them a Hollywood Music in Media Award for Best Original Score for an Animated Film and a BMI Film & TV Award for Film Music.

2021and 2022 saw Danna working for HBO Max on the acclaimed series Julia, based on the life of iconic chef Julia Child, and he reteamed with Mychael and Cartoon Saloon co-founder Nora Twomey for My Father’s Dragon. A reunion with Guillermo del Toro followed as Danna composed the music for the episodeThe Graveyard Rats in Guillermo del Toro’s Cabinet of Curiosities.

Filmography

Film

1980s-1990s

2000s

2010s

2020s

Television

Television films

Television series

Video games
Trollhunters: Defenders of Arcadia (2020)

Awards and nominations

References

External links

 
 
 

1964 births
Animated film score composers
Best Original Score Genie and Canadian Screen Award winners
Canadian classical composers
Canadian film score composers
Canadian male classical composers
Canadian television composers
La-La Land Records artists
Living people
Male film score composers
Male television composers
Musicians from Ontario
People from Burlington, Ontario
Pixar people
Varèse Sarabande Records artists